Ron McLean may refer to:
 Ron McLean (politician) (1938–1999), Australian politician
 Ron McLean (environmentalist) (1914–1980), New Zealand farmer, aviator, community leader and environmental campaigner
 Ron McLean (writer) (1944–1985), Australian screenwriter and producer

See also
 Ron MacLean (born 1960), Canadian sportscaster
 Ronald McLean (1881–1941), British gymnast